Kemecse is a district in central part of Szabolcs-Szatmár-Bereg County. Kemecse is also the name of the town where the district seat is found. The district is located in the Northern Great Plain Statistical Region. This district is a part of Rétköz geographical region.

Geography 
Kemecse District borders with Kisvárda District to the northeast, Baktalórántháza District to the southeast, Nyíregyháza District to the south, Ibrány District to the west. The number of the inhabited places in Kemecse District is 11.

Municipalities 
The district has 2 towns and 9 villages.
(ordered by population, as of 1 January 2013)

The bolded municipalities are cities.

Demographics

In 2011, it had a population of 22,066 and the population density was 90/km².

Ethnicity
Besides the Hungarian majority, the main minority is the Roma (approx. 2,000).

Total population (2011 census): 22,066
Ethnic groups (2011 census): Identified themselves: 21,663 persons:
Hungarians: 19,597 (90.46%)
Gypsies: 1,900 (8.77%)
Others and indefinable: 166 (0.77%)
Approx. 500 persons in Kemecse District did not declare their ethnic group at the 2011 census.

Religion
Religious adherence in the county according to 2011 census:

Reformed – 8,356;
Catholic – 7,241 (Roman Catholic – 5,443; Greek Catholic – 1,798);
Evangelical – 92;
other religions – 360;
Non-religious – 1,175; 
Atheism – 55;
Undeclared – 4,787.

Gallery

See also
List of cities and towns of Hungary

References

External links
 Postal codes of the Kemecse District

Districts in Szabolcs-Szatmár-Bereg County